Cretevania is an extinct genus of Evaniidae, which lived in what is now China, Burma, England, Lebanon, Mongolia, Russia and Spain during the Cretaceous period. the genus was described by Rasnitsyn in 1975, and the type species is Cretevania minor.

Species
 Cretevania alcalai Peñalver et al., 2010
 Cretevania alonsoi Peñalver et al., 2010
 Cretevania bechlyi Jennings, Krogmann & Mew, 2013
 Cretevania concordia Rasnitsyn, Jarzembowski & Ross, 1998
 Cretevania cyrtocerca (Deans, 2004) Peñalver et al., 2010
 Cretevania exquisita (Zhang, Rasnitsyn, Wang & Zhang, 2007) Peñalver et al., 2010
 Cretevania major Rasnitsyn, 1975
 Cretevania meridionalis Rasnitsyn, 1991
 Cretevania minor Rasnitsyn, 1975 (type)
 Cretevania minuta Rasnitsyn, 1975
 Cretevania montoyai Peñalver et al., 2010
 Cretevania pristina (Zhang & Zhang, 2000) Peñalver et al., 2010
 Cretevania rubusensis Peñalver et al., 2010
 Cretevania tenuis Li et al., 2018
 Cretevania venae Li et al., 2018
 Cretevania vesca (Zhang et al, 2007) Peñalver et al., 2010

Phylogeny
Cladogram after Peñalver et al. (2010).

References

Evanioidea
Fossil taxa described in 2010
Cretaceous insects of Asia
Prehistoric insects of Europe
Prehistoric Hymenoptera genera